Dead Rider, formerly known as D. Rider, is an American experimental rock band from Chicago, Illinois, United States. It was created by former U.S. Maple guitarist Todd Rittman, including Rittman as guitar and lead vocalist, Andrea Faught on trumpet and keyboard, Thymme Jones on keyboard, and Matt Espy on drums.

History
Dead Rider formed in 2009. Their third album, Chills on Glass, was released by independent record label Drag City in 2014. It premiered on the website for High Times magazine.

Works
Studio albums
 Mother of Curses (Tizona Records, 2009)
 The Raw Dents (Tizona Records, 2011)
 Chills On Glass (Drag City, 2014)
 Crew Licks (Drag City, 2017)
Dead Rider Trio featuring Mr. Paul Williams (Drag City, 2018)

Singles
 The Walk Slow (Joyful Noise Recordings, 2013)

Videos
 Body to Body (to Body)
 Two Nonfictional Lawyers
 Mother's Meat
 Touchy
 The Pointed Stick
 Blank Screen

Reviews
 Dead Rider - "Mother's Meat" (The Raw Dents) | Jon Treneff | Dusted Magazine | 2011.5.10 | review
 Chicago band Dead Rider to bring 'end of civilization' rock to Kalamazoo | Mark Wedel | MLive | 2011.3.25 | review of Touchy
 D. Rider - Mother of Curses | Joshua Klein | Pitchfork | 2009.4.20 | review
 Dead Rider, "The Raw Dents" | Joe Gross | Spin | 2011.5.23 | review
 D. Rider – "Mother of Curses" LP – Tizona Records (Album As Art #64) | The Gumshoe Grove | 2011.3.28 | review
 Q&A: Dead Rider | Lauren Zens | Alarm Magazine | 2011.7.25 | interview with Todd Rittman

See also
 U.S. Maple

References

External links
 
 Dead Rider (formerly D. Rider) | Chicago Independent Distribution
 Dead Rider | Joyful Noise Recordings
 D. Rider | Discogs
 About Dead Rider | MTV

Musical groups from Chicago
Musical groups established in 2009
Experimental rock groups